Gamma Ursae Minoris (γ Ursae Minoris, abbreviated Gamma UMi, γ UMi), also named Pherkad , is a star in the northern constellation of Ursa Minor. Together with Beta Ursae Minoris (Kochab), it forms the end of the dipper pan of the "Little Dipper", which is an asterism forming the tail of the bear.

Nomenclature
γ Ursae Minoris (Latinised to Gamma Ursae Minoris) is the star's Bayer designation. The fainter 11 Ursae Minoris has been called γ¹ Ursae Minoris, in which case Gamma Ursae Minoris would be designated γ². However this usage is rarely seen.

Gamma Ursae Minoris bore the traditional name Pherkad, which derived from the Arabic فرقد farqad "calf", short for aḫfa al farkadayn "the dim one of the two calves", that is Pherkad and Kochab (the full name Ahfa al Farkadain is traditionally applied to Zeta Ursae Minoris). Gamma Ursae Minoris was mostly called Pherkad Major to distinguish it from Pherkad Minor (11 Ursae Minoris). In 2016, the International Astronomical Union organized a Working Group on Star Names (WGSN) to catalogue and standardize proper names for stars. The WGSN approved the name Pherkad for Gamma Ursae Minoris on 21 August 2016 and it is now so included in the List of IAU-approved Star Names.

Properties
Gamma Ursae Minoris has apparent magnitude +3.05 and can be readily observed with the naked eye even in a city-lit night sky. It has an absolute magnitude of –2.84. Measurement of the star's spectrum resulted in a stellar classification of A3 Iab, with the luminosity class of 'Iab' indicating this is an intermediate luminosity supergiant star. The effective temperature of the star's outer envelope is 8,280 K, giving it the typical white hue of an A-type star. It is rotating rapidly, with the projected rotational velocity of  providing a lower limit on the azimuthal velocity along the star's equator.

This is classified as a shell star that has a circumstellar disk of gas around the star's equator, which may be causing it to vary in magnitude. It is 1100 times more luminous than the Sun, and possesses a radius 15 times that of the Sun.

Pherkad in fiction

Pherkad (spelled as Pherkard) features in Cthulhu Mythos.

References

Ursa Minor (constellation)
Ursae Minoris, Gamma
Delta Scuti variables
A-type giants
Pherkad
Ursae Minoris, 13
075097
5735
137422
Durchmusterung objects
Northern pole stars